Combat Squad is a 1953 American war film directed by Cy Roth and starring John Ireland, Lon McCallister and Hal March. It is set during the Korean War.

Plot

Cast
 John Ireland as Sgt. Ken 'Fletch' Fletcher  
 Lon McCallister as Martin  
 Hal March as Henry Gordon  
 George E. Stone as Medic Brown 
 Norman Leavitt as Fred Jones  
 Myron Healey as Marley  
 Don Haggerty as Sgt. Wiley  
 Tristram Coffin as Captain Johnson 
 David Holt as Garvin  
 Dick Fortune as Kenson  
 Robert Easton as Lewis  
 Jill Hollingsworth as Yvonne  
 Linda Danson as Anne  
 Neva Gilbert as Virginia 
 Eileen Howe as Patricia 
 Dirk Evans as Heroic GI  
 Paul Keast as Colonel  
 Bob Peoples as Wounded GI

References

Bibliography
 Paul M. Edwards. A Guide to Films on the Korean War. Greenwood Publishing Group, 1997.

External links
 

1953 films
1953 war films
American war films
Columbia Pictures films
Korean War films
Films scored by Paul Dunlap
American black-and-white films
1950s English-language films
Films directed by Cy Roth
1950s American films